Dziedzickia is a genus of flies belonging to the family Mycetophilidae.

The genus has almost cosmopolitan distribution.

Species:
 Dziedzickia absyrta Lane, 1954 
 Dziedzickia armata Freeman, 1951

References

Mycetophilidae
Sciaroidea genera